Gatis Tseplis (born May 1, 1971) is a Latvian former professional ice hockey defenceman.

Career
Gatis Tseplis arrived to the United States from Riga, Latvia, after spending 12 years playing five seasons of professional hockey in Russia and the Czech Republic. From 1996 to 1997 he played for the Huntsville Channel Cats, the Nashville Nighthawks, and the San Antonio Iguanas. During the 1997 to 1998 season, Tseplis played under Bill McDonald and his Fort Worth Brahmas team, scoring 19 goals and 45 assists for 64 points and was ranked 3rd in the league amongst defenseman in scoring. Due to his scoring abilities, he played a two-game call-up against Detroit Vipers.

From 1998 to 1999 Tseplis played with the Fort Worth Fire and the San Antonio Iguanas and in total scored 21 goals and 51 assists for 72 points which ranked him 5th in defenseman scoring for the Central Hockey League.

He participated in a game against New Mexico Scorpions in 2001 which ended with 3-0 loss for Tulsa Oilers. During 2001-2002 season he netted 13 goals and contributed with 29 assists for 42 points in 63 games. By the end of the season he was awarded with the Rick Kozuback Award.

For the 2002-2003 season, Tseplis initially signed for the Lubbock Cotton Kings of the CHL but ultimately never played for the team. Instead, he spent the season playing for the Knoxville Ice Bears in the Atlantic Coast Hockey League, in what was his final season before retiring.

His memorabilia is in Texas Hockey Museum.

Career statistics

References

External links

1971 births
Living people
Corpus Christi Icerays players
Detroit Vipers players
Fort Worth Brahmas players
Fort Worth Fire players
Huntsville Channel Cats (CHL) players
Knoxville Ice Bears (ACHL) players
HC Kometa Brno players
KooKoo players
Latvian expatriate sportspeople in the United States
Latvian ice hockey defencemen
Nashville Nighthawks players
New Mexico Scorpions players
San Antonio Iguanas players
Soviet ice hockey defencemen
Ice hockey people from Riga
Tulsa Oilers (1992–present) players
Latvian expatriate ice hockey people
Latvian expatriate sportspeople in Finland
Latvian expatriate sportspeople in the Czech Republic
Expatriate ice hockey players in the United States
Expatriate ice hockey players in the Czech Republic
Expatriate ice hockey players in Finland